Gissing v Gissing [1970] UKHL 3 is an English land law and trust law case dealing with constructive trusts arising in relationships between married couple. It may no longer represent good law, since the decisions of Stack v Dowden and Jones v Kernott.

Facts
Mr and Mrs Gissing were married in 1935, their early 20s. They had a son in 1939 while living in a flat in Tulse Hill. She worked as a printer (where she stayed as a secretary till 1957). He got a job with the same firm after the war, and they bought 28 Tubbenden Drive as a matrimonial home in 1951 for £2695, £2150 from a mortgage in Mr Gissing’s name, and conveyed into Mr Gissing’s sole name. Mrs Gissing spent £220 of her own money on buying furniture and the laying of the lawn. Mr Gissing always paid the mortgage instalments, but left to live with another woman in 1961. She claimed he told her then the house was hers. She succeeded in 1966 in getting a divorce on grounds of his adultery, with a maintenance order but later reduced to 1s a year, and she brought an action that she would be entitled to an equitable interest in the home.

Judgment

Court of Appeal
The majority of the Court of Appeal held that Mrs Gissing was entitled to an equitable interest in the home. Lord Denning MR held that Mrs Gissing was entitled to a half equitable interest in the property, because the home was acquired as a joint venture, even though she contributed no money directly to buying the property. He said the following.

Phillimore LJ concurred.

Edmund Davies LJ dissented, denouncing the ‘palm tree justice’ of the majority.

House of Lords
The House of Lords held that Mrs Gissing had made no contribution to the house from which a beneficial interest could be inferred. No inference for a common intention to share in the home's equity could be inferred.

Lord Reid said the following.

Lord Diplock said the following.

Notes

External links
 Judgment on BAILII

English property case law
House of Lords cases
1970 in case law
1970 in British law